9 to 5, or working time, is the standard period of working hours for some employees.

9 to 5 or Nine to Five may also refer to:

Film and television
 9 to 5 (film), a 1980 American comedy film 
 9 to 5 (soundtrack)
 9 to 5 (TV series), a 1980s series based on the film
 9 to 5 (musical), a 2008 musical based on the film
 9 to 5: Days in Porn, a 2008 documentary film

Music
 "9 to 5" (Dolly Parton song), 1980
 "9 to 5" (Sheena Easton song) or "Morning Train (9 to 5)" (1980)
 "9 to 5" (Lady Sovereign song), 2005
 Nin9 2 5ive, a 2004 album by Joey Yung
 "9 2 5", a song by Terror Jr from their 2019 EP Come Outside and Break Your Heart

Other uses
 9to5, or National Association of Working Women, an American organization
 9 to 5, a comic strip by Harley Schwadron
 From 9 To 5, a comic strip by Jo Fischer

See also
 
 
 9to5Mac, an Apple news website